In the game of bridge, Leaping Michaels is a conventional overcall in 4 or 4 made in defense to opposing 2-level or 3-level preemptive openings. A variant of the Michaels cuebid, Leaping Michaels shows a strong two-suited hand (5-5 or longer) that is less suitable for a takeout double and is game forcing.

Holding such two-suited hands and using Leaping Michaels, opponent's opening preempts between 2 and 3 inclusive are overcalled in accordance with the following table:

After (3) – 4, a bid of 4 asks for the major. The bids 4 and 4 are to play.

Following (3) – 4 the bid of 4 is played as pass-or-correct.

Some partnerships prefer to interchange the meanings of the 4 and 4 bids following a 3 preempt so that 4 denotes diamonds and an undisclosed major. This has the advantage that the 4 becomes available to ask for the major suit. The 4/4 responses can then be played as natural (to play).

Leaping Michaels can be utilised after natural two-level preempts, but also after conventional preempts such as Muiderberg. Even after a Multi 2 diamonds preempt, Leaping Michaels can be utilised to good effect:

(2) – 4 : Clubs and an undisclosed major (4 asks for the major)
(2) – 4 : Diamonds and an undisclosed major (4 is pass-or-correct)

References

Bridge conventions